The Amur Cart Road or Amur Wheel Road ( or , tr. ) was a  cartage road in Amur Oblast of Imperial Russia that connected Khabarovsk with Blagoveshchensk through mostly uninhabited areas of taiga and swamps. 

The road was built during 1898–1909 with nearly exclusive usage of katorga prison labor. It was praised as a success in its use of penal labor, claiming that no other country had any prison labor project comparable in scale. In 1905 over 700 convicts were simultaneously at work on the road.  In this respect it was unsurpassed in the Gulag system of the Soviet Union.

See also
Siberian Route
Kolyma Highway
Amur Highway

References
Andrey Sobol, Kолесуха ("Kolesukha"), 1925, memoirs, in Russian.

Roads in Siberia
1900s establishments in the Russian Empire
Transport in Amur Oblast